Ken James (born 19 January 1945) is an Australian basketball player. He competed in the men's tournament at the 1972 Summer Olympics.

References

1945 births
Living people
Australian men's basketball players
Olympic basketball players of Australia
Basketball players at the 1972 Summer Olympics
Place of birth missing (living people)